The Democratic Party of Pensioners (DSP) was a political party in Bosnia and Herzegovina led by Alojz Knezović.

History
The party contested the 1998 general election, although only running in the Federation of Bosnia and Herzegovina. It received 0.8% of the national vote, failing to win a seat. However, it did win two seats in the House of Representatives of the Federation of Bosnia and Herzegovina.

In the 2000 parliamentary election the party increased its vote share to 1.1.% and won a single seat. It also won a single seat in the Federation's House of Representatives.

References

Defunct political parties in Bosnia and Herzegovina